Psorothamnus is a genus of plants in the legume family. These are shrubs and small trees. Many are known by the general common name indigo bush. Some are referred to as daleas, as this genus was once included in genus Dalea. These are generally thorny, thickly branched, strongly scented bushes. Most species bear lupinlike raceme inflorescences of bright purple legume flowers and gland-rich pods. Psorothamnus species are native to the southwestern United States and northern Mexico. The genus is paraphyletic and it has been proposed that the genus Psorodendron be reinstated to accommodate sections Xylodalea, Capnodendron, and Winnemucca.

Species
Psorothamnus comprises the following species:
 Psorothamnus arborescens (A. Gray) Barneby—Mojave indigo bush
 var. arborescens (A. Gray) Barneby
 var. minutifolius (Parish) Barneby
 var. pubescens (Parish) Barneby
 var. simplicifolius (Parish) Barneby
 Psorothamnus emoryi (A. Gray) Rydb.—dyebush, Emory's indigo bush
 Psorothamnus fremontii (A. Gray) Barneby—Fremont's indigo bush
 var. attenuatus Barneby
 var. fremontii (A. Gray) Barneby
 Psorothamnus kingii (S. Watson) Barneby—King's dalea
 Psorothamnus nummularius (M.E. Jones) S.L. Welsh
 Psorothamnus polydenius (S. Watson) Rydb.—Nevada dalea
 Psorothamnus schottii (Torr.) Barneby—Schott's dalea
 Psorothamnus scoparius (A. Gray) Rydb.—broom dalea
 Psorothamnus spinosus (A. Gray) Barneby—smoketree, smokethorn

 Psorothamnus thompsoniae (Vail) S.L. Welsh & N.D. Atwood—Thompson's dalea

References

External links
CalFlora Database: Psorothamnus
Jepson Manual eFlora (TJM2) treatment of Psorothamnus
USDA Plants Profile for Psorothamnus

 
Fabaceae genera
Flora of the California desert regions
Flora of the Great Basin
Natural history of the Mojave Desert